Milecastle 67 (Stainton) is a conjectured milecastle of the Roman Hadrian's Wall.  The site of the milecastle has been calculated from measurement to known milecastle sites, but no remains providing proof of its existence have been identified, though Roman coins were found in 1861, during the digging of the adjacent railway cutting.

Excavations and investigations
1861 – Roman coins found during railway cutting construction.

Associated turrets 
Each milecastle on Hadrian's Wall had two associated turret structures.  These turrets were positioned approximately one-third and two-thirds of a Roman mile to the west of the Milecastle, and would probably have been manned by part of the milecastle's garrison.  The turrets associated with Milecastle 67 are known as Turret 67A and Turret 67B, though no evidence of either has been identified.

Monument records

References

Bibliography

67